The 2014 Lakeside World Professional Darts Championship was the 37th World Championship organised by the British Darts Organisation, and the 29th staging at the Lakeside Country Club at Frimley Green.

Scott Waites was the defending men's champion, having won the title for the first time in the 2013 championship, but he was defeated 0–3 in the first round by eventual runner-up Alan Norris, who in turn lost to first seed Stephen Bunting in the final.
The defending women's champion was Anastasia Dobromyslova, who won her third title in 2013. She lost to the eventual champion Lisa Ashton in the semi-finals.

This tournament saw the biggest field ever for a BDO World Championship. 56 players – 40 men, up from 32 in 2013, and 16 women – up from 8 in 2013 – competed for the world titles.

Players from around the globe competed to reach the BBC televised finals, which ran from 4–12 January 2014.

Format and qualifiers

Prize money
The prize money was increased to £300,000 for the men's event and £29,000 for the women's event. There is a £52,000 bonus for hitting a Nine-dart finish in both versions of the tournament.

Men's
The televised stages feature 40 players – an increase from 32 in previous years. The top 16 players in the BDO Invitational Rankings over the 2012/13 season are seeded for the tournament. Players who finish between 17th and 24th in the invitational rankings receive a bye into the last 32. The remaining 16 players enter in the preliminary rounds – this includes recent world champions not in the top 24, a qualifier from each of the eight WDF regions, four players who came through the pre-qualifying knockout tournament, and the Winmau World Masters winner (if not already qualified). Should there be fewer than 40 players qualified after the above process, the next unqualified player from the invitational rankings will be entered until the total reaches 40.

Women's
The televised stages feature 16 players, an increase from 8 in previous years. The top 8 players in the WDF/BDO rankings over the 2012/13 season are seeded for the tournament.

Top 8
  Deta Hedman
  Trina Gulliver
  Anastasia Dobromyslova
  Julie Gore
  Rachel Brooks
  Fallon Sherrock
  Aileen de Graaf
  Irina Armstrong

Other qualifiers
  Lorraine Farlam
  Rachna David
  Sharon Prins
  Lisa Ashton
  Karin Krappen

Hull qualifiers
  Ann-Louise Peters
  Rilana Erades
  Tamara Schuur

Draw

Men

Preliminary round
Played from 4 to 6 January. All matches best of 5 sets.

Last 32

1 Martin Atkins retired from the championship due to an elbow injury while trailing 2-0 in sets to Hofstra.

Women's
Lisa Ashton won her first world championship title. In the final she trailed Deta Hedman 0–2 before turning the match.

Media coverage
On 6 January 2013 it was announced the BBC had signed a three-year deal to show the Lakeside World Championships from 2014 to 2016, on 4 December 2013 it was announced the BBC will show the tournament exclusively in Britain which they did from 1978 to 2011.  This means most matches (bar the first ladies match) will be shown live on BBC One, BBC Two, BBC Red Button, BBC Website and the BBC iPlayer.

It was also announced the coverage would still be presented by Colin Murray and Bobby George which it has been since 2010 despite Murray leaving Match of the Day 2 and BBC Radio 5 Live to move to talkSPORT. Rob Walker returned to the Lakeside as reporter and Darts Extra presenter which is a role he has held since 2010.  Commentary is once again provided by Tony Green, Vassos Alexander and Jim Proudfoot, along with John Rawling for the first time. Green has commentated for the BBC for every year of the Lakeside from 1978 to 2010 and 2012–present missing the 2011 Championships due to illness, Alexander replaced Green in 2011 and continues in the role for 2014 and Proudfoot commentated on the 2013 championships replacing David Croft who moved to Sky to commentate on Formula One. BDO players Scott Mitchell, Tony O'Shea, Deta Hedman and Trina Gulliver also contributed to the commentary.

References

External links
 The official site of the Lakeside BDO World Professional Darts Championship

BDO World Darts Championships
BDO World Darts Championship
BDO World Darts Championship
BDO World Darts Championships
Sport in Surrey
Frimley Green